PGL Travel Ltd is a company founded in 1957 and is a provider of school activity courses and summer camps for children in the United Kingdom.  Along with NST, European Study Tours and StudyLink it is a part of the HB Education group, owned by Midlothian Capital Partners.

History 

PGL Travel Ltd. was established in 1957 as ‘PGL Voyages’ and is a provider of school activity courses and adventure holidays for children.

In the 1960s and early 1970s the ‘PGL Experience' was aimed at young adults and based on three main activities - canoeing, sailing and pony trekking, with accommodation in tents. PGL moved into the school and group travel market and during the 1980s expanded, purchasing more properties, ranging from a mansion house in Perthshire to a converted farm in Oxfordshire.

PGL opened a headquarters in the South of France and became one of the first UK organisers of canoeing holidays in the Ardèche Gorge.

In the early 90s the acquisition by the company of the former Quest Outdoor Adventure programme as well as of a large number of centres operated by competitors, resulted in a considerable expansion in the schools’ adventure market in the UK and France. In 1993 the company also entered the school ski market with the acquisition of Ski Europe and Ski Wessex.

In 2000, PGL purchased Château de Grande Romaine, a 300-bed former hotel and grounds on the eastern outskirts of Paris. 

In 2005, PGL completed their biggest purchase ever, of 3D Education and Adventure, their biggest competitor, which gave the company three more centres on the South Coast of England, one on the Isle of Wight and a contract with Pontins to provide children's activities on their sites. Though with Pontins going into administration in 2010   and subsequently being purchased by the Britannia Hotels Group in 2011, the contract between Pontins and PGL ceased to be sometime in 2011. 

The company was sold in 2007 to Holidaybreak Plc  and formed the first part of the Holidaybreak 'Education Division'.
Significant property acquisitions in the UK in recent years have included Caythorpe Court, near Grantham in 2004 and in 2009, Liddington in Wiltshire.

In July 2011, Holidaybreak was purchased by Cox & Kings Limited, based in India and then in 2014 PGL opened an office in Melbourne, Australia and acquired two centres in Victoria and one in Queensland, Campaspe Downs, Camp Rumbug and Kindilan.

In 2017, PGL sought to acquire two new centres - Newby Wiske Hall - formerly North Yorkshire Police Headquarters  and Bawdsey Manor on the Suffolk Heritage Coast   The purchase of Newby Wiske Hall is still 'subject to contract' due to PGL's applications for planning consent for change of use and listed building consent for the site being referred for Judicial Review in January 2018.

PGL's largest area of business continues to be school trips and educational travel. These range from activity and adventure trips to subject focussed trips (Science, ICT, Maths, Field Studies and French Language courses). During the UK school terms PGL mainly offers school and youth group holidays, as well as birthday parties and day trips. Outside of the UK school terms, PGL also offers family and child-only adventure holidays (summer camps).

In 2020, the coronavirus crisis had an effect on its business with disputes with customers concerning refunds.

Holidays 

During the UK school terms PGL mainly offers school and youth group holidays, as well as birthday parties and day trips. Outside of the UK school terms PGL also offers family and child-only summer camps.

The most popular holiday run is the "Multi-Activity" where guests get to sample a range of activities.

Abroad 
PGL has centres in France for School and other youth groups. These offer both activity and educational holidays.

Northern France 

 Le Pré Catelan, Hauts-de-France
 Château du Tertre, Ambrières-les-Vallées, Mayenne although it is in Mayenne it is close to, and advertised as, Normandy
 Château de Grande Romaine, Île-de-France

References

Sources 
The Independent
BBC news article
Article from The FT on acquisition by Cox & Kings
Article from Travel Weekly
Article on expansion to the Australian market
BBC article on purchase of PGL Liddington 
Article on purchase of Caythorpe Court

External links 

Travel and holiday companies of the United Kingdom